The Fondation Cartier pour l'Art Contemporain, known simply as the Fondation Cartier, is a contemporary art museum located at 261 boulevard Raspail in the 14th arrondissement of the French capital, Paris.

History
The Fondation Cartier was created in 1984 by the Cartier SA firm as a center for contemporary art that presents exhibits by established artists, offers young artists a chance to debut, and incorporates works into its collection. The founding director was Marie-Claude Beaud. 

In 1994, it moved to its current location in a glass building designed by Pritzker Prize architect Jean Nouvel on the site of the former American Center for Students and Artists, surrounded by a modern woodland garden landscaped by Lothar Baumgarten. The ground floor of the building is eight meters (26 feet) high and glassed in on all sides.

In 2011, the president and founder of the Fondation Cartier, Alain Dominique Perrin, asked Nouvel to draw up preliminary plans for a new base on Île Seguin. By 2014, the foundation abandoned plans to relocate to the island and instead commissioned Nouvel to work on the expansion of its current premises.

Collection

The museum displays exhibits of contemporary and international artists, and currently contains over 1500 works by more than 350 artists. Its collections include monumental works such as The Monument to Language by James Lee Byars, Caterpillar by Wim Delvoye, Backyard by Liza Lou, La Volière (The Aviary) by Jean-Pierre Raynaud, and Everything that Rises Must Converge by Sarah Sze; works by contemporary French artists including Vincent Beaurin, Gérard Garouste, Raymond Hains, Jean-Michel Othoniel, Alain Séchas, Pierrick Sorin, Jean Giraud; and works by foreign artists including James Coleman (Ireland), Thomas Demand (Germany), Alair Gomes (Brazil), William Kentridge (South Africa), Bodys Isek Kingelez (the Congo), Guillermo Kuitca (Argentina), Yukio Nakagawa (Japan), Huang Yong Ping (China), and Damian Pettigrew (Canada).

Exhibitions 

The museum opens daily except Monday, with an admission fee. Nearby Paris Métro stations include Raspail or Denfert-Rochereau on Line 4 and Line 6.

 1986 : Les Années 1960, la décade triomphante
 1987 : Hommage à Ferrari
 1988 : MDF des créateurs pour un matériau
 1988 : Vraiment faux
 1991 : La Vitesse
 1992 : À visage découvert – Machines d'architecture
 1993 : Azur
 1994 : Nobuyoshi Araki – Jean-Michel Alberola
 1995 : Vija Celmins – Thierry Kuntzel – James Lee Byars – Bodys Isek Kingelez – Défilés et Vestiaires de Macha Makeieff et Jérôme Deschamps – Malick Sidibé –
 1996 : Double vie, Double vue – Comme un oiseau – Tatsuo Miyajima – Marc Couturier – By Night
 1997 : Amours – Coïncidences – Alain Séchas – Patrick Vilaire
 1997 : Histoire de voir – la collection de la Fondation Cartier dans l'art contemporain dans les chateaux du Bordelais – Marina Faust – Seydou Keita – Gabriel Orozco – Jean-Michel Othoniel
 1998 : Issey Miyake – Être nature – Francesca Woodman – Panamarenko – Gérard Deschamps
 1999 : Sarah Sze – Herb Ritts – 1 monde réel – Radi Designers – Gottfried Honneger
 2000 : Bernard Piffaretti – Thomas Demand – Le Désert – Okhai Ojeikere – Guillermo Kuitca – Cai Guo-Qiang
 2001 : Gérard Garouste – William Eggleston – Un art populaire – Pierrick Sorin – Alair Gomes
 2002 : Ce qui arrive – Takashi Murakami – Fragilisme
 2003 : Daido Moriyama – Jean-Michel Othoniel – les Yanomami –
 2004 : Hiroshi Sugimoto – Raymond Depardon – Pain couture par Jean-Paul Gaultier – Chéri Samba – Marc Newson 
 2005 : Juergen Teller – Ron Mueck – John Maeda – J'en rêve – Adriana Varejão – Rinko Kawauchi
 2006 : Tabaimo – Gary Hill – Agnès Varda – Tadanori Yokoo
 2007 : Lee Bul – Robert Adams – Rock'n'roll 39–59 – David Lynch
 2008 : Patti Smith – Andrea Branzi – César – Terre Natale, Ailleurs commence ici (Raymond Depardon / Paul Virilio)
 2009 : Beatriz Milhazes – William Eggleston – Né dans la rue
 2010 : Jean Giraud  – Moebius-Transe-Forme – Metamoebius by Damian Pettigrew
 2011 : Les Trésors du Vaudou – Mathématiques, un dépaysement soudain
 2012 : Histoires de voir, Show and Tell – Yue Minjun : L'Ombre du sourire
 2013 : Ron Mueck – America Latina 1960 
 2014 : Mémoires Vives, Vivid Memories – Diller & Scofidio + Renfro Musings on a Glass Box – Guillermo Kuitca Les Habitants 2015 : Bruce Nauman – Beauté Congo 1926–2015 Congo Kitoko
 2021–2022: Damien Hirst  – Cherry Blossoms See also 
 List of museums in Paris
 World Architecture Survey

Sources
 Fondation Cartier pour l'Art Contemporain
 Paris.fr entry
 Paris'', Petit Futé, 2007, page 129. .

References 

Art museums and galleries in Paris
Jean Nouvel buildings
Art museums established in 1984
1984 establishments in France
Buildings and structures in the 14th arrondissement of Paris
Cartier 
Tourist attractions in Paris
Cartier